Radzim may refer to the following places in Poland:
Radzim, a former fortress near Starczanowo, Poznań County (west-central Poland)
Radzim, Kuyavian-Pomeranian Voivodeship (north-central Poland)
Radzim, West Pomeranian Voivodeship (north-west Poland)

Or to Radim Gaudentius, the first Archbishop of Gniezno.